Vigia is a municipality in the northeastern part of the state of Pará, Brazil.  The town was founded on 16 January 1616.  The population is 54,172 (2020 est.) in an area of 539.08 km².

Population history

References

External links
https://web.archive.org/web/20070203101758/http://www.citybrazil.com.br/pi/stoantoniomilagres/ 
Municipal anthem of Vigia 

Municipalities in Pará